CCR may stand for:

Arts and entertainment

Music
 Creedence Clearwater Revival, an American rock band
 Creedence Clearwater Revival (album), the 1968 debut album by Creedence Clearwater Revival
 Creedence Clearwater Revisited, a rock band formed in 1995 by two former Creedence Clearwater Revival members
 Cross Canadian Ragweed, an American country music band

Other uses in arts and entertainment
 ChuChu Rocket!, a puzzle game for the Sega Dreamcast developed by Sonic Team in 1999
 Yasuo Motoki, a fictional character in Wangan Midnight

Law and prisons
 California Code of Regulations, formerly the California Government Code
 Center for Constitutional Rights, formerly the Emergency Civil Liberties Committee, a non-profit dedicated to civil and human rights law
 Constitutional Court of Romania
 Court for Crown Cases Reserved (abbreviation CCR is used in case citations)
 Covenants, Conditions, and Restrictions
 Closed cell restricted or solitary confinement

Organizations
 Canadian Council for Refugees, a non-governmental organization that critiques the Government of Canada's public policy regarding refugee settlement and determination
 Center for Cerebrovascular Research, A UCSF research organization specializing in cerebrovascular disease
 Center for Constitutional Rights, a non-profit legal advocacy organization
 Centre for Cross-cultural Research at the Australian National University, 1997–2008?
 Chelmsford City Racecourse, a horse racing course in Essex, UK
 Cistercian College, Roscrea, a Catholic boarding school for boys
 Citizens for a Canadian Republic, an anti-monarchy group in Canada
 Colonial Christian Republic, a United States right-wing Christian militia group
 Communität Casteller Ring, a German Lutheran religious order for women
 Rangpur Cadet College, Rangpur, Bangladesh
 League for Catholic Counter-Reformation

Science and technology

Biology and medicine
 C-C motif receptor, beta chemokine receptor
 Cannabis and Cannabinoid Research, a peer-reviewed academic journal discussing medical cannabis, cannabinoids, and endocannabinoids
 Cardiocerebral resuscitation, a variation of Cardiopulmonary Resuscitation
 Carbon catabolite repression, part of the adaptive metabolic control system
 Chemokine receptor, a term in cell biology
 Continuity of Care Record, a health record standard
 Creatinine clearance rate, a measure of kidney/renal function
 Crotonyl-CoA carboxylase/reductase, an enzyme

Electronics and computing
 Center for Communications Research, two research centers (one in Princeton and the other in La Jolla) administered by the Institute for Defense Analyses
 Cluster continuous replication, a form of data replication introduced in Microsoft Exchange 2007
 Concurrency and Coordination Runtime, from the Microsoft Robotics Developer Studio
 Condition Code Register, or status register, in computer processor architecture
 Constant current regulator, an electronic circuit
 Customer Configuration Repository, a service of Oracle Corporation's support for Oracle Database, subsequently known as Oracle Configuration Manager (OCM)

Other uses in science and technology
 Canonical commutation relation, a concept in physics
 Carbon capture readiness, a European Union energy generation requirement
 Cargo control room of a tank-ship where the person in charge monitors and controls many aspects of liquid cargo movement
 Change Control Request
 Coal combustion residuals, a term for coal combustion products
 Conradson Carbon Residue, in crude-oil refining, a measurement similar to Ramsbottom carbon residue and micro carbon residue
 Koenigsegg CCR, an automobile
 Johnson–Corey–Chaykovsky reaction

Sport
 CEAT Cricket Ratings
 Central City Rollergirls, an English roller derby league
 Closed circuit rebreather (CCR), a type of self-contained underwater breathing apparatus used in scuba diving
 Convict City Roller Derby League, based in Tasmania

Transportation
 Canada Central Railway 
 CCR S.A., a Brazilian toll road operator
 Central Canada Railway, a predecessor to Northern Alberta Railways 
 Concord/Buchanan Field Airport (IATA airport code CCR)
 Corinth and Counce Railroad

Other uses
 Calculated course rating, a component of the Golf Australia Handicap System
 Calendar of the Close Roll, book series translating and summarizing these medieval documents
 Catholic Charismatic Renewal, a movement within the Catholic Church
 Central Contractor Registration, a U.S. Government supplier database, replaced in 2012 by the System for Award Management (SAM)
 Chandigarh Capital Region, urban area in and around Chandigarh, India
 Circus Circus Reno, a hotel and casino located in Reno, Nevada
Collective cabinet responsibility, a constitutional convention in Parliamentary systems of Government
 Combat Command Reserve, a level of military organization employed by the U.S. Army from 1942 to  1963
 Consumer confidence report, an annual water quality report in the United States
 Corporate credit rating, in investment, a bond credit rating assessing the credit worthiness of a corporation's debt issues
 Curly-coated retriever, a breed of dog

See also
 2CR (disambiguation)
 CRR (disambiguation)